Chlidanota is a genus of moths belonging to the family Tortricidae.

Species
Chlidanota thriambis Meyrick, 1906

References

 , 1906, Journal of the Bombay Natural History Society 17: 412.
 , 2005, World Catalogue of Insects volume 5 Tortricidae

External links
tortricidae.com

Chlidanotini
Taxa named by Edward Meyrick
Tortricidae genera